Stillaguamish people are a Native American tribe located in northwest Washington in the United States near the city of Arlington, Washington, near the river that bears their name, the Stillaguamish River. They are an indigenous people of the Northwest Plateau, specifically, a Southern Coast Salish people. Today, Stillaguamish people are enrolled in the federally recognized tribes Stillaguamish Tribe of Indians and Tulalip Tribes of Washington.

History
Stillaguamish people today are descendants of the Stoluck-wa-mish River Tribe, who lived along the Stillaguamish River in the 1850s. They had multiple villages along the river, with notable locations including: Skabalko (at modern day Arlington), Chuck-Kol-Che (near modern day Trafton), Sŭl-gwähs' (at downtown Stanwood) and Sp-la-tum (near modern day Warm Beach). 

On January 22, 1855, the Stillaguamish people signed the Point Elliott Treaty as the "Stoluck-wa-mish." Many members of the tribe moved to the Tulalip Reservation, and others stayed along the river. Years later, in 2014, the Stillaguamish Reservation was established northwest of Arlington and the former village of Skabalko.

The Stillaguamish Tribe of Washington ratified its constitution on January 31, 1953, establishing a democratically elected, six-member tribal council. In 1974, the Stillaguamish Tribe petitioned for recognition from the United States Government and received recognition on October 27, 1976. 

In 2003, the enrolled population of the tribe was 237. The tribe manages the salmon populations in the Stillaguamish River watershed with the help of Washington Department of Fish & Wildlife. As part of this effort, the tribe has a hatchery which releases chinook and coho salmon, running educational activities about salmon.

Notes

References
 Pritzker, Barry M. A Native American Encyclopedia: History, Culture, and Peoples. Oxford: Oxford University Press, 2000. .

External links
Stillaguamish Tribe, official website
 Tulalip Tribes, official website
Stillaguamish Tribe of Indians Natural Resources Department
U.S. Department of Health and Human Services - Indian Health Service - Stillaguamish Tribe

Coast Salish
Native American tribes in Washington (state)
Tulalip Tribes